The X Corps is a corps of the Pakistan Army, currently assigned in Rawalpindi, Punjab Province of Pakistan. It is one of two corps that are currently active in Kashmir. One of its most important brigades, the 111th Infantry Brigade in Rawalpindi, is assigned Presidential Guard duties along with ceremonial duties for foreign dignitaries arriving in Pakistan.The current commander of this corps is Lt. Gen Shahid Imtiaz.

History
The X Corps was raised in 1974 by Lt. General Aftab Ahmad Khan. Headquartered in Rawalpindi, it is responsible for operations in some areas of Kashmir. Before that, all formations in Kashmir were controlled directly from GHQ.
As an ode to Lt. General Aftab Ahmad Khan, the insignia of the X Corps features a Rising Sun or Aftab (in Urdu) with 10 rays extruding from it.

Serving on the Line of Control
In 1974, as today, the Indian and Pakistani forces face each other across the Line of Control (LoC), and there are often exchanges of fire, and sometime full-scale battles. Since 1974, the formation's primary occupation has been to protect Pakistani interests on the LoC.

Siachen conflict

In 1984, the Pakistan Army was involved in a major skirmish with the Indian Army in the northernmost part of the disputed region of Kashmir. Under the command of Lt Gen Zahid Ali Akbar Khan, the X Corps was put into action on the highest battlefield in the world.

Kargil War

In 1999, under the command of Lt Gen Mahmud Ahmed,  the conflict over Kargil saw the corps enter action, in Kargil itself, and all along the LoC. Over several weeks in June 1999, the entire corps was engaged for the first time in its history. During the fighting, Havildar Lalak Jan, a trooper of the corps would earn the Nishan-e-Haider.

Structure 
X Corps has following units under its operational control:- 5 infantry divisions, 1 infantry brigade, 1 armoured brigade, 1 artillery brigade, 1 signal brigade and 1 engineering brigade.

List of corps commanders

References

Further reading
Brain Cloughley, A History of Pakistan Army

Corps of the Pakistan Army
Military units and formations established in 1974